Christoph Moritz (born 27 January 1990) is a German professional footballer. He plays as a defensive midfielder.

Career
Moritz began his footballing career in 1994, at the age of four, as a youth player with FC Viktoria 08 Arnoldsweiler. He stayed here for twelve years before moving to Alemannia Aachen. After three years with the youth and reserve teams, he signed for Schalke 04 in July 2009 where he started his professional career. Moritz's first professional match was in the Bundesliga on 8 August 2009 against 1. FC Nürnberg and scored his first goal on 16 August 2009. Moritz signed his first professional contract on 18 January 2010 with Schalke 04. The contract ran until 30 June 2013.

Upon expiration of his contract with Schalke he joined Mainz 05 on a contract until 30 June 2017.

In May 2018, following 1. FC Kaiserslautern's relegation from the 2. Bundesliga, Moritz' move to Hamburger SV, newly relegated to the 2. Bundesliga, was announced. He agreed a contract until 2020.

In September 2020, Moritz signed for Jahn Regensburg.

Honours
Schalke 04
 DFB-Pokal: 2010–11

References

External links
 
 
 
 

1990 births
Living people
People from Düren
Sportspeople from Cologne (region)
German footballers
Footballers from North Rhine-Westphalia
Association football midfielders
Germany youth international footballers
Germany under-21 international footballers
Alemannia Aachen players
FC Schalke 04 II players
FC Schalke 04 players
1. FSV Mainz 05 players
1. FC Kaiserslautern players
Hamburger SV players
Hamburger SV II players
SV Darmstadt 98 players
SSV Jahn Regensburg players
Bundesliga players
2. Bundesliga players
3. Liga players
Regionalliga players